Edward S. Hallinan (August 23, 1888 – August 24, 1940) was a shortstop in Major League Baseball. He played for the St. Louis Browns.

Biography
Born in San Francisco, Hallinan spent two years in the major leagues with the St. Louis Browns. He served in World War I and then worked for the San Francisco County Clerk's office for more than 20 years. He died of cancer in 1940.

References

External links

1888 births
1940 deaths
Major League Baseball shortstops
St. Louis Browns players
Baseball players from San Francisco
Alameda Encinals players
Saint Mary's Gaels baseball players
Oakland Oaks (baseball) players
Los Angeles Angels (minor league) players
Sacramento Sacts players
Venice Tigers players
Sacramento Wolves players
Mission Wolves players
Salt Lake City Bees players
San Francisco Seals (baseball) players